Metro/Airport station is a light rail station at First Street and Metro Drive in San Jose, California, United States. This station is served by the Blue and Green lines of the VTA Light Rail system.

VTA Bus Route  connects to the San José International Airport from this station.

Services

Platform layout

References

External links 

Santa Clara Valley Transportation Authority light rail stations
Airport railway stations in the United States
Railway stations in San Jose, California
Railway stations in the United States opened in 1987
1987 establishments in California